Vadans may refer to:

Vadans, Jura, a commune in the French region of Franche-Comté
Vadans, Haute-Saône, another commune in the French region of Franche-Comté